"The Love I Saw in You Was Just a Mirage" is a 1967 song recorded by the American R&B group The Miracles on Motown Records' Tamla label. Written by Miracles members Smokey Robinson and Marv Tarplin and produced by Robinson, it is noted for being the first single to bill the group as "Smokey Robinson" & the Miracles, a billing already present on the group's albums by this time. Miracles members Smokey Robinson and Pete Moore were the song's producers.

Lyric content and chart history
The single was a Top 20 hit on the Billboard Hot 100, and a Top 10 hit on Billboard's R&B singles chart. As with several of the Miracles' hits, "Mirage" begins with Tarplin's guitar and he plays the riff on a 12-string acoustic guitar. The song's lyrics feature Robinson's character as a man deceived by the beauty of a woman who showed "the promise of love", but then sadly discovered that her love was "just a mirage".

Cash Box called the single a "driving R&B workout that should get a lot of play."

Films and cover versions
The Jackson 5, Vance Gilbert and The Uniques are among the acts who have recorded cover versions of "The Love I Saw in You Was Just a Mirage". The original 45 RPM single had The Miracles' "Come Spy with Me", (the original theme song to the 1967 20th Century Fox film of the same name), as the B-side.

The hit "A" side, The Miracles' "The Love I Saw In You Was Just A Mirage," was also used in a film, the soundtrack of the 1980 crime drama, "American Gigolo" starring Richard Gere. Gere actually sang along to The Miracles' original recording in the film.

Personnel

The Miracles
Lead vocals by Smokey Robinson
Background vocals by Claudette Rogers Robinson, Pete Moore, Ronnie White and Bobby Rogers
Guitar by Marv Tarplin

Other personnel
Other instrumentation by The Funk Brothers

References

External links
 See The Miracles perform the song on YouTube

Tamla Records singles
1967 singles
The Miracles songs
Songs written by Smokey Robinson
Songs written by Marv Tarplin
Song recordings produced by Smokey Robinson
1967 songs